Procordulia affinis is a species of dragonfly in the family Corduliidae, known as the western swamp emerald. 
It inhabits rivers, pools and lakes in south-western Australia.

Procordulia affinis is a small to medium-sized black and orange-yellow dragonfly with a thick, flattened tail.

Gallery

See also
 List of dragonflies of Australia

References

Corduliidae
Odonata of Australia
Endemic fauna of Australia
Taxa named by Edmond de Sélys Longchamps
Insects described in 1871